Antimargarita bentarti is a species of sea snail, a marine gastropod mollusk in the family Margaritidae.

Distribution
This marine species occurs in Antarctic waters off the South Shetland Islands.

References

 Aldea C., Zelaya D.G. & Troncoso J.S. (2009) Two new trochids of the genus Antimargarita (Gastropoda: Vetigastropoda: Trochidae) from the Bellingshausen Sea and South Shetland Islands, Antarctica. Polar Biology 32:417–426. page(s): 42
 Engl W. (2012) Shells of Antarctica. Hackenheim: Conchbooks. 402 pp.

External links
 To Encyclopedia of Life
 To World Register of Marine Species

 bentarti
Gastropods described in 2009